Nilton Gonzalo Marcos Soto Garcia (born 30 December 1997) is a Peruvian Greco-Roman wrestler. He won one of the bronze medals in the 67 kg event at the 2019 Pan American Games held in Lima, Peru after Shalom Villegas was stripped of his silver medal.

In 2020, he competed in the Pan American Olympic Qualification Tournament, held in Ottawa, Canada, without qualifying for the 2020 Summer Olympics in Tokyo, Japan. In May 2021, he also failed to qualify for the Olympics at the World Olympic Qualification Tournament held in Sofia, Bulgaria.

He won one of the bronze medals in his event at the 2022 Pan American Wrestling Championships held in Acapulco, Mexico.

Major results

References

External links 
 

Living people
1997 births
Place of birth missing (living people)
Peruvian male sport wrestlers
Wrestlers at the 2019 Pan American Games
Medalists at the 2019 Pan American Games
Pan American Games medalists in wrestling
Pan American Games bronze medalists for Peru
Pan American Wrestling Championships medalists
21st-century Peruvian people